= Spring New Year festival =

Spring New Year festival may refer to the following:

- Nowruz, Iranian New Year
- Chinese New Year
